Hemiopinae is a subfamily of click beetles in the family Elateridae. There are at least four genera in Hemiopinae.

Genera
These four genera belong to the subfamily Hemiopinae:
 Exoeolus Broun, 1893
 Hemiops Laporte, 1838
 Legna Walker, 1858
 Parhemiops Candèze, 1878

References

Further reading

 

Elateridae